Grabbers is a 2012 monster horror comedy film directed by Jon Wright and written by Kevin Lehane. A co-production of Ireland and the United Kingdom, the film stars Richard Coyle, Ruth Bradley, Bronagh Gallagher and Russell Tovey among an ensemble cast of Irish actors.

Grabbers premiered at the Sundance Film Festival in 2012, and received mostly positive reviews upon release.

Plot
Garda Ciarán O'Shea (Richard Coyle), an alcoholic, initially resents his new partner, Garda Lisa Nolan (Ruth Bradley), a workaholic seeking to impress her superiors by volunteering for temporary duty in a remote Irish island. After discovering mutilated whale corpses, the quiet community slowly comes to realise that they're under attack by bloodsucking tentacled aliens of various sizes that came from a ball of green light that fell from the sky, dubbing them "Grabbers". When Paddy (Lalor Roddy), the town drunk, inexplicably survives an attack, the local marine ecologist, Dr. Smith (Russell Tovey), theorizes that his high blood alcohol content proved toxic to the Grabbers, who survive on blood and water. O'Shea contacts the mainland, but an oncoming storm prevents any escape or help. The group also realizes the rain will allow the remaining large male Grabber to move about the island freely. Seeking to keep calm in the town, Nolan and O'Shea organize a party at the local pub, intending to keep the island's residents safe but unaware of the danger. Initially hesitant to join in a celebration when no good reason can be offered, the people enthusiastically agree when Brian Maher (David Pearse), the pub owner, offers free drinks. O'Shea volunteers to stay sober so that he can coordinate the town's defenses, and everyone else becomes drunk.

In a drunken stupor, Nolan reveals that she has come to the island to escape the shadow of her more-favoured sister. When they are alone in a squad car, Nolan confesses to O'Shea that she has feelings for him despite turning down his advances earlier. Smith wanders outside the pub and tries to get a picture of the beast, reasoning that his inebriated state will protect him from being eaten. Instead, the monster throws him into the air and kills him. Nolan and O'Shea escape to the pub, where they try to protect the townspeople. Nolan drunkenly reveals the danger they are in while trying to reassure everyone that nothing is trying to kill them. Panicked, they retreat to the second level of the pub, and baby grabbers take over the first floor. Nolan accidentally sets the pub on fire while trying to sneak out, but she and O'Shea manage to draw the attention of the adult.

O'Shea and Nolan drive to a construction site, and the monster follows them. There, they hope to strand the monster on dry land, as it needs water to survive. Before they can successfully set a trap, the monster arrives and attacks O'Shea. Although wounded, he survives the attack, and Nolan uses the heavy construction equipment to mount a counter-attack, pinning it at the base of a pit. The monster grabs O'Shea, but before it can eat him he dumps a bottle of Paddy's poitín into its mouth, sickening it and causing it to release him. Nolan then ignites nearby explosives with a flare gun, killing the Grabber. As the storm clears up, O'Shea throws away his flask, and they return to town. Unknown to anyone, more Grabber eggs are buried on the beach, and they are about to hatch.

Cast
 Richard Coyle as Garda Ciarán O'Shea
 Ruth Bradley as Garda Lisa Nolan
 Russell Tovey as Dr. Smith
 Lalor Roddy as Paddy Barrett
 David Pearse as Brian Maher
 Bronagh Gallagher as Una Maher
 Pascal Scott as Dr Jim Gleeson
 Ned Dennehy as Declan Cooney
 Clelia Murphy as Irene Murphy
 Louis Dempsey as Tadhg Murphy
 Stuart Graham as Skipper
 Micheál Ó Gruagáin as Father Potts
 Darran Watt as Tommy (Islander)

Release
The film premièred at the 2012 Sundance Film Festival and played at the Edinburgh International Film Festival in June 2012.  The film continued its festival run across the world screening at Karlovy Vary International Film Festival, Taormina Film Fest, Fantasia Film Festival, PIFAN, Sitges, Toronto After Dark Film Festival, Strasbourg European Fantastic Film Festival, London FrightFest Film Festival and held its Irish première in July 2012 as the opening film of the 24th Galway Film Fleadh.

Reception

Critical response
On Rotten Tomatoes the film has an approval rating of 72% based on reviews from 32 critics, with an average rating of 6.23/10. On Metacritic it has a score of 62 out of 100 based on reviews from 12 critics, indicating "generally favorable reviews".

Damon Wise of Empire film magazine described it as "a romantic but surprisingly scary monster movie that feels like a lost Amblin flick, shaken and stirred with a dash of The Guard. ... a finely crafted tribute to a long-lost style of filmmaking [that] stands up in its own right too." Matt Glasby of Total Film rated it 3/5 stars and called it "a bright, breezy Irish monster mash boasting gorgeous cinematography, appealing performances and great SFX". Gareth Jones of DreadCentral rated it 4/5 stars and said, "it is one hell of a good time that offers plenty of laughs, excellent characters and performances, and big slimy monsters." Jordan Hoffman of US cable channel IFC summed the film up as "a delightful romp", while Upcoming Movies gave it four stars and called it a "fun, monster movie roller coaster" with a "mix of laughs and scares".  The Daily Telegraphs Robbie Collin called it a "cherishable Irish B-picture ... with an unimprovable premise".

Kim Newman of Screen Daily said of the film: "Kevin Lehane's smart script is canny enough to sidestep the expectations of fans who might think they know how films like this are supposed to play out, while the monsters are as well-realised as anything in far more costly productions." Donald Clarke of The Irish Times said, "Grabbers has an atmosphere all its own: the humour is earthy without being patronising; the action sequences are both absurd and properly exciting."  Peter Bradshaw of The Guardian rated the film 3/5 stars and described it as "a likable and technically impressive comedy-horror" that is "fantastically silly, often funny".  Sam Adams of The A.V. Club rated the film B- and criticized the film's climax as "a letdown" and "cheap imitation" compared to the first half's "sharp-edged parody".  Marc Mohan of The Oregonian rated it C- and called it "a one-dimensional, one-joke film."   In a negative review for Variety, Dennis Harvey called the film polished and watchable, but criticized the writing as "pretty tepid, middlebrow stuff".  Nigel Andrews of the Financial Times rated it 1/5 stars and said, "For a horror comedy it needed some comedy and some horror."

Accolades

At the Edinburgh International Film Festival, it was announced as one of the "Best of the Fest" of the 2012 line-up. At the Strasbourg European Fantastic Film Festival, it won the Audience Prize for Best Film, and at NIFFF, it won two awards: the Audience Award for best film and the Titra Film Award.

The film picked up two 2014 Fangoria Chainsaw Award nominations for Best Script for Kevin Lehane and Best Creature/FX for Shaune Harrison and Paddy Eason. It was also nominated for a Writers' Guild of Great Britain Award for Best First Feature for Kevin Lehane as well as for four IFTAs at the 2013 Irish Film and Television Awards. Bronagh Gallagher for Best Supporting Actress, Kevin Lehane for Best Feature Script, producers David Collins and Martina Niland of Samson Films, alongside Forward Films and High Treason Productions were nominated for Best Film and Ruth Bradley was nominated and won for Best Actress.

References

External links
 
 

2012 films
2012 horror films
2012 comedy horror films
2010s monster movies
British comedy horror films
Irish comedy horror films
English-language Irish films
Films set in Ireland
Giant monster films
Irish science fiction horror films
2010s science fiction horror films
Alien invasions in films
2012 comedy films
British science fiction horror films
2010s English-language films
2010s British films